The 2014 Colgate Raiders football team represented Colgate University in the 2014 NCAA Division I FCS football season. They were led by first-year head coach Dan Hunt and played their home games at Crown Field at Andy Kerr Stadium. They were a member of the Patriot League. They finished the season 5–7, 3–3 in Patriot League play to finish in a tie for third place.

Schedule

Source: Schedule

References

Colgate
Colgate Raiders football seasons
Colgate Raiders football